Sphingobacterium daejeonense is a Gram-negative, strictly aerobic, non-spore-forming and non-motile bacterium from the genus of Sphingobacterium which has been isolated from compost.

References

External links
Type strain of Sphingobacterium daejeonense at BacDive -  the Bacterial Diversity Metadatabase

Sphingobacteriia
Bacteria described in 2006